An acervulus (pl. acervuli) is a small asexual fruiting body that erupts through the epidermis of host plants parasitised by mitosporic fungi of the form order Melanconiales (Deuteromycota, Coelomycetes). It has the form of a small cushion at the bottom of which short crowded conidiophores are formed. The spores escape through an opening at the top.

Sources 

 Trigiano, Robert Nicholas, Mark Townsend Windham, Alan S. Windham. (2004) Plant Pathology: Concepts and Laboratory Exercises. CRC Press. pp. 11,129,137.

Fungal morphology and anatomy
Asexual reproduction